Samsung Hub may refer to:

 Samsung Music Hub, Samsung's digital entertainment store 
 Samsung Hub (building), a skyscraper located in the central business district of Singapore